The Putnam County, Georgia arson attack was an attack on the black community by white mobs in May of 1919.

Racial violence
From the night of Tuesday, May 27, 1919 until Wednesday, May 28,1919, morning arsonists burned down at least six black churches and multiple black community buildings in and around Eatonton. The Wheeling Intelligencer claimed the buildings were burnt down because of a "minor racial clash at Dennis Station" when a black man was refused a bottle of soda water. The community raised $1,100 ($ in ) reward for any information about the people responsible for the fires.

A few miles away in Milledgeville, Georgia white and black mobs armed themselves and roamed the town when an argument broke when the white and black schools choose the same colors. Respected black preacher J.A. Martin noticed that in Milledgeville's black community "the males carried their guns with as much calmness as if they were going to shoot a rabbit in a hunt, or getting ready to shoot the Kaiser's soldiers." There was a lot of tension in the black community as white soldiers were lauded upon their return while Black soldiers, who also fought in WWI, were ignored.

Aftermath

This uprising was one of several incidents of civil unrest that began in the so-called American Red Summer, of 1919. Terrorist attacks on black communities and white oppression in over three dozen cities and counties. In most cases, white mobs attacked African American neighborhoods. In some cases, black community groups resisted the attacks, especially in Chicago and Washington DC. Most deaths occurred in rural areas during events like the Elaine Race Riot in Arkansas, where an estimated 100 to 240 black people and 5 white people were killed. Also in 1919 were the Chicago Race Riot and Washington D.C. race riot which killed 38 and 39 people respectively, and with both having many more non-fatal injuries and extensive property damage reaching up into the millions of dollars.

See also
Washington race riot of 1919
Mass racial violence in the United States
List of incidents of civil unrest in the United States

References

Bibliography
 - Total pages: 368  

    

Red Summer
1919 in Georgia (U.S. state)
African-American history between emancipation and the civil rights movement
White American riots in the United States
1919 riots in the United States
Racially motivated violence against African Americans
History of racism in Georgia (U.S. state)
Riots and civil disorder in Georgia (U.S. state)
May 1919 events